The 1960–61 season was Manchester United's 59th season in the Football League, and their 16th consecutive season in the top division of English football. It was also United's first season in the inaugural Football League Cup, and for the second successive season they finished seventh in the league.

First Division

FA Cup

League Cup

Squad statistics

References

Manchester United F.C. seasons
Manchester United